Lajos Somodi Jr. (born 10 November 1953) is a Hungarian foil fencer. He competed in the individual and team foil events at the 1976 Summer Olympics.

References

External links
 

1953 births
Living people
Hungarian male foil fencers
Olympic fencers of Hungary
Fencers at the 1976 Summer Olympics
Martial artists from Budapest